The 1982–83 Danish 1. division season was the 26th season of ice hockey in Denmark. Eight teams participated in the league, and the Rødovre Mighty Bulls won the championship. The Frederikshavn White Hawks were relegated.

Regular season

Playoffs

Semifinals
Rødovre Mighty Bulls - Rungsted IK 2–0 (5–0, 5–1)
AaB Ishockey - Herlev IK 2–1 (4–7, 10–2, 10–2)

Final
Rødovre Mighty Bulls - AaB Ishockey 2–1 (6–7, 3–2 OT, 4–3)

3rd place
Herlev IK - Rungsted IK 2–1 (3–6, 5–3, 4–3)

Relegation
KSF Copenhagen - Vojens IK 2–1 on series
Hellerup IK - Frederikshavn White Hawks 2–0 on series
KSF Copenhagen - Hellerup IK 2–1 on series
Vojens IK - Frederikshavn White Hawks 2–0 on series

External links
Season on eliteprospects.com

Dan
1982 in Danish sport
1983 in Danish sport